E Series is a series of Maldivian anthology thriller web series produced by Fathimath Fareela under 24 Entertainments. The first chapter titled Baby written and directed by Yoosuf Shafeeu, stars Ibrahim Jihad, Aminath Shuha and Ibrahim Yaeesh in main roles. It follows a confused husband digging deeper into his wife's alleged affairs.

The second chapter titled Hissu, directed by Ismail Shafeeq, stars Ibrahim Jihad in lead role and narrates the challenges and struggles a husband goes through in search of his missing wife. The third segment titled Bahdhal, directed by Jihad follows the supernatural encounters faced by a womanizer (Ahmed Easa).

Cast and characters
Baby
 Ibrahim Jihad as Rashid
 Aminath Shuha as Zeyba
 Ibrahim Yaeesh as Sameer
 Mohamed Faisal as Siraj; Sameer's brother
 Mohamed Afrah as Jaufar; Zeyba's father
 Ibrahim Muneez as Muneez
 Mariyam Sana as Zeeshan
 Ahmed Azmee as Azmee

Hissu
 Ibrahim Jihad as Zahir
 Rafiu Mohamed as Riyaz
 Fathimath Sujana as Shiuna
 Mohamed Rifshan as Ziyadh, Zahir's half-brother
 Mohamed as Modex

Bahdhal
 Ahmed Easa as Laamiu
 Fathimath Sujana as Faahira
 Shima as Sadhiya
 Zack as Hassan
 Mohamed Afrah as Zameer

Chapters

Development
On 14 November 2021, it was revealed that first chapter of the series titled Baby will feature Ibrahim Jihad, Aminath Shuha and Ibrahim Yaeesh in the main role. The series marks the debut performance of Ibrahim Yaeesh, who was selected by director Yoosuf Shafeeu for the role after an audition. Filming for the third segment titled Bahdhal commenced in November 2021.

Release and reception
The first chapter was made available for streaming through Baiskoafu on 9 July 2022 on the occasion of Eid al-Adha 1443. The three episode limited series met with positive reviews from critics, where Saajid Abdulla from MuniAvas particularly praised the performance of the leading actors including the newcomer, Ibrahim Yaeesh. The second chapter was made available for streaming through Baiskoafu on 10 August 2022. Upon release, the three episodes limited series met with positive reviews from critics, particularly praising the screenplay pace and performance of the lead actor. The first episode of the third chapter titled Bahdhal was released on 13 October 2022.

References

Serial drama television series
Maldivian television shows
Maldivian web series